Warren United is a British animated comedy series centred on Warren Kingsley, a football fanatic whose interest in the sport is starting to impinge on his family life.

The show was cancelled after one series due to poor ratings. Warren United began airing on 22 April 2014 on ITV4.

Plot
The series centres on Warren Kingsley, a 37½-year-old kitchen salesman who supports a football team called Brainsford United. He lives with his family which includes his wife Ingrid, their 13-year-old daughter Charlie and 7-year-old son Harrison, Warren's mother and her French-Canadian boyfriend Reggie.

Production
The show's working title was The Wild World of Warren.

Cast and characters
Darren Boyd as Warren Kingsley
Eleanor Lawrence as Ingrid Kingsley, Warren's wife from Eindhoven
Morgana Robinson as Charlotte "Charlie" Kingsley, their 13-year-old daughter
Morwenna Banks as Harrison Kingsley, their 7-year-old son
Nitin Ganatra as Dilip, Warren's best friend
Georgie Glen as Warren's mother
Tony Law as Reggie, her French-Canadian boyfriend
Johnny Vegas as Fat Baz, the manager of Brainsford United
Jonathan Kydd as Burger Al, the owner of a burger van, and as Trevor, a Police Horse
Robert Portal as Michael, a Police Horse
Clive Tyldesley as The Commentator

Episode guide

See also
Fugget About It

References

External links

2010s British adult animated television series
2010s British animated comedy television series
2010s British sports television series
2010s British sitcoms
2014 British television series debuts
2014 British television series endings
British adult animated comedy television series
English-language television shows
ITV sitcoms
Fictional association football television series
Animated television series about children
Animated television series about dysfunctional families